Boyky was the seventh ship of the  of the Soviet Navy.

Construction and career
The ship was built at North Nikolayev Shipyard in Mykolaiv and was launched on 14 October 1959 and commissioned into the Black Sea Fleet on 3 December 1959.

On October 14, 1961, the ship entered the Black Sea Fleet of the Soviet Navy. May 19, 1966 she was reclassified into a large missile ship (BRK). In the period from 6 to 11 August 1966, she paid a visit to Alexandria (Egypt). From 15 to 20 February 1969 was in Conakry (Guinea), and from 5 to 10 October - in Lagos (Nigeria).

On June 8, 1970, the destroyer was transferred to the Red Banner Northern Fleet. In the period from October 23, 1970, to April 6, 1973, she was modernized and rebuilt according to the Project 57-A at the Shipyard named after 61 Communards in Nikolaev. November 2, 1972 transferred from the subclass of large missile ships to the subclass of large anti-submarine ships.

On February 9, 1988, the destroyer was excluded from the Soviet Navy in connection with the delivery to the OFI for disarmament, dismantling and sale. On July 17, 1988, the Boyky's crew was disbanded. In the fall of 1988, the ship was sold to a Spanish company for cutting into metal, but on the way from the Kola Bay to El Ferrol on November 14, 1988, in a strong storm, she was thrown onto the coastal rocks off Skogsøya Island in the Norwegian Sea.

References

In Russian

External links

 
 
Gallery of the ship. Navsource. Retrieved 11 August 2021

Ships built at Shipyard named after 61 Communards
Kanin-class destroyers
1960 ships
Cold War destroyers of the Soviet Union